The 2023 Ivy League women's basketball tournament was the postseason women's basketball tournament for the Ivy League of the 2022–23 NCAA Division I women's basketball season. It took place on March 10 and 11, 2023, at the Jadwin Gymnasium on the campus of Princeton University in Princeton, New Jersey. Princeton won its fourth Ivy League championship, earning an automatic bid to the 2023 NCAA Division I women's basketball tournament, the team's tenth appearance.

Seeds
The top four teams in the Ivy League regular-season standings qualify for the tournament and are seeded according to their records in conference play, resulting in a Shaughnessy playoff. If a tie for any of the top four positions exists, tiebreakers are applied in the following order:
 Head-to-head record between teams involved in the tie.
 Record against the top team(s) not involved in the tie in order of conference record, going down through the seedings until the tie is broken.
 Average of the teams' ranking in the following computer systems: NCAA NET, Sagarin, KenPom, and ESPN Basketball Percentage Index.

Schedule

Bracket

See also
 2023 Ivy League men's basketball tournament

References

Tournament
Ivy League women's basketball tournament
Sports in Princeton, New Jersey
College basketball tournaments in New Jersey
Ivy League Women's Basketball Tournament
Ivy League Women's Basketball Tournament
Ivy League Women's Basketball Tournament